Vigarano Mainarda is a comune (municipality) in the Province of Ferrara in the Italian region Emilia-Romagna, located about  northeast of Bologna and about  west of Ferrara.

Vigarano Mainarda borders the following municipalities: Bondeno, Ferrara, Poggio Renatico and Terre del Reno

Science

The Vigarano meteorite fell here in 1910: it is considered the prototype of a class of carbonaceous chondrites known as "CV group" (where the "V" comes from the name Vigarano). Vigarano-like carbonaceous (CV) chondrites contain once-melted (igneous) CAIs that crystallized Al-, Ti-rich calcic pyroxene (fassaite) containing Ti 3+
 The substantial Ti 3+ in these pyroxenes indicates highly reduced crystallization conditions in their parental melts, which also record the oldest radiometric ages of all Solar System materials.

People
 Paolo Mazza (1901–1981), football manager. 
 Carlo Rambaldi (1925–2012), special effects artist

Twin towns
 Caudebec-lès-Elbeuf, France
 Salgótarján, Hungary
 Altomonte, Italy

References

External links

 Official website
 The Marathon of Vigarano

Cities and towns in Emilia-Romagna